| camera               = Single-camera
| runtime              = 67–85 minutes
| company              = AStory
| network              = tvN
| picture_format       = 1080i (HDTV)
| audio_format         = Dolby Digital
| first_aired          = 
| last_aired           = 
}}

100 Days My Prince is a 2018 South Korean television series starring Doh Kyung-soo and Nam Ji-hyun. The series aired on tvN from September 10 to October 30, 2018, every Monday and Tuesday at 21:30 (KST). It is one of the highest-rated Korean dramas in cable television history.

Synopsis
Lee Yul is the king's nephew who enjoys spending his days playing instead of studying. He enjoys playing with the peasant children alongside his best friend and guardian, Dong-joo. One day, as he is playing with the peasant children where they play the villains, Yul uses his status to punish the children by beating them up, oblivious that his actions are hurting them. The children could not object to this treatment due to Yul's status. A girl, Yoon Yi-seo intervenes and chides Yul for his cruel actions. Like Yul, Yi-seo is from a noble family, but is kind, smart and compassionate. Yul instantly develops a crush on Yi-seo, and this causes him to change to become more studious in order to impress her. Yi-seo's father is a general and the right-hand man of the king.

However, Yul's father is an ambitious man who is jealous of his brother, the king, and vies for the throne. Scheming with another ambitious man, Kim Cha-eon, they plot to overthrow the current king, with the promise that Cha-eon will be handsomely rewarded. One night, Kim Cha-eon begins the coup which sees the king and all his men and allies ruthlessly murdered, including Yi-seo's father. While fatally injured, Yi-seo's father instructs his elder son Seok-ha to take Yi-seo and run away, as Cha-eon is determined to wipe out the entire family. As Cha-eon is about to deal the killing blow, Yul, who has been witnessing the whole thing, comes out from his hiding to stop Cha-eon, threatening that he will report this matter to his father. Cha-eon then carries Yul back to his father' mansion and it is then made known that he has been conspiring with Cha-eon for the whole thing all along, shocking Yul. Yul is removed from the scene and the coup is completed successfully. Due to this, Yul's father is crowned as the new king and Cha-eon becomes the vice-premier. Yul automatically assumes the title of Crown Prince, and is further shocked on the coronation day with the news of his mother's "accidental death". Despite the new king's surprise at the news, it becomes clear that the vice-premier will be the person who has the most power and control of the new reign. Yul bitterly resents his new position as the Crown Prince of Joseon.

Sixteen years later, Yul has grown up to be a cold and unlikable crown prince, due to the trauma of his past. Yul is also very smart and skilled in the martial arts. His father is now remarried to the new queen who dislikes him and wants the Crown Prince title for her own son while he himself is married to Kim So-hye, who is Vice-premier Kim's daughter. Despite the marriage, Yul still longs for Yi-seo, even though he believes that Yi-seo was killed. This causes him to despise the crown princess and her father. Yul constantly avoids consummating the marriage, despite the various schemes to ensure the consummation takes place. At the same time, a drought occurs in Joseon and people begin to blame Yul and his refusal to consummate the marriage as the reason. Annoyed, Yul orders all the singles in the nation to be married off in a month to help alleviate the drought.

While en route to a rain ritual, Yul and his followers are ambushed by assassins arranged by Cha-eon, and he is almost killed. The crown princess was pregnant with another's child (later revealed to be Mu Yeon's, Hong-shim/Yi-Seo's brother) and the crown prince's assassination attempt was to escape from her predicament. His childhood friend and guardian, Dong-joo, forces them to switch their garments, essentially luring the attackers away from Yul. Dong-joo is subsequently killed and falls into the river. The attackers do not see his face and thus believe that it is Yul. Meanwhile, Yul gets shot with an arrow on his chest while on the run, and accidentally knocks his head, becoming unconscious. When he wakes up, he has already lost his memory.

Yi-seo, who managed to escape unscathed in the coup years ago, has been adopted by a commoner man and now lives undercover as a peasant girl named Hong-shim in Songjoo Village. It is her adoptive father who eventually finds the terribly wounded Yul and nurses him back to consciousness. The fate of her brother Seok-ha is unknown, as they separated after Seok-ha buried her under a stack of leaves and ran away to lure Cha-eon's people who were hunting them in the woods. Before separating, they promised to wait for each other at a bridge every 15th of the month. While Yi-seo goes to the bridge as promised without fail, it has been sixteen years since the separation and she is beginning to lose hope that her brother is still alive.

As a single woman, Hong-shim is also subjected to the crown prince's marriage decree and she happens to be the oldest single woman in the village. Due to the imbalance number of single men and women, Hong-shim finds herself the only one without a pair. Instead, she receives an offer to become the concubine of a lecherous nobleman. Hong-shim refuses because she says that she is already betrothed to a man named Won-deuk who is serving in the military and has no intention of being the nobleman's fifth wife. The deadline for the decree passes by and since Hong-shim is still unmarried, she is subjected to the punishment of 100 floggings. To save her, her father takes advantage of Yul's amnesia. A very skeptical Yul is told that he is Hong-shim's betrothed, Won-deuk, a man whom her father had recommended but whom she had never met.

Thus, Yi-seo and Yul get married while neither of them are aware of each other's true identities.
The rest of the story follows how the prince seems very strange to the commoner's lifestyle and is initially considered a good-for-nothing-husband by the villagers. However, his skills of reading, writing and martial arts remain which impresses Hong-shim and the villagers. He eventually returns to the palace and regains his memories of Yi-seo later and the two reunite again.

Cast

Main
 Do Kyung-soo as Lee Yul / Na Won-deuk
 Jung Ji-hoon as young Lee Yul
An idealistic crown prince who transforms into a low status man after a near fatal accident. Despite his amnesia, Yul maintains the speaking style of a noble man, to the villagers' annoyance and also lands himself in constant trouble because of this. He also retains his intelligence and martial arts skill, especially archery. However, he is completely useless with daily chores and activities of a peasant, such as making straw shoes, using the sickle, and chopping wood. 
 Nam Ji-hyun as Yeon Hong-shim / Yoon Yi-seo
 Heo Jung-eun as young Yoon Yi-seo
An intelligent and strong woman who used to be a noblewoman and now runs Joseon's first all-solution agency in Songjoo village. She is shown to be fiercely independent and crass at times, and is always getting into arguments with Won-deuk. She hides her true identity from everyone in the village, except for her adoptive father. She longs to be reunited with her brother.
 Jo Sung-ha as Kim Cha-eon
The evil vice-premier who is also the father-in-law of Lee Yul. He is the most powerful man in the nation and controls even the king. A ruthless man, he is ready to employ any actions necessary to gain and maintain his power.
 Han So-hee as Kim So-hye
 Choi Myung-bin as young Kim So-hye
 Crown Princess, Kim Cha-eon's daughter and Lee Yul's wife. Like Yul, she is also forced into the marriage and is constantly neglected by her husband. She secretly harbours feelings for Moo-yeon, one of her father's hired killers and the father of the child she becomes pregnant with, causing great distress for her and her father, as she never consummated her marriage with Yul. 
 Kim Seon-ho as Jung Jae-yoon
Formerly ranked 7a at the Capital, then Magistrate (6b) of the Songjoo village, then hidden advisor of the Crown Prince. He has a one-sided love for Hong-shim. He has prosopagnosia or "face blindness", which causes him to initially be unable to recognize Won-deuk as the crown prince. The only face that he could recognize is Hong-shim's. He is smart and wise, and is one of the few people to earn Lee Yul's trust.
 Kim Jae-young as Moo-yeon / Yoon Seok-ha
 Jung Joon-won as young Yoon Seok-ha
Yi-seo's elder brother and Kim Cha-eon's main hired killer. Despite knowing that Cha-eon killed his father, he continues to serve Cha-eon as he is constantly being threatened with the hunting down and killing of his lost sister, Yi-seo. He is shown to be ruthless and amazingly skilled in the martial arts. He is also unafraid to wield his sword and kill anyone Cha-eon instructs him. Despite this, he longs to be free from this lifestyle and bargains with Cha-eon for his release, with one final assignment - to murder the Crown Prince. He is later shown to be heavily conflicted between running away with his sister to start a new life, and being with the Crown Princess with whom he is in love and who is pregnant with his child. He is also conflicted upon learning that the man he has been ordered to kill is now married to his sister.

Supporting

People around Lee Yul
 Jo Han-chul as the King
Lee Yul's father who is shown to be a puppet king, ineffective due to being under the vice-premier's control. His relationship with Yul is strained due to the manner in which he seized the throne and the consequences surrounding Yul's mother's death.
 Oh Yeon-ah as Queen Park
Lee Yul's step-mother. She is ambitious and longs for the Crown Prince title to be transferred to her son. It is shown that the King constantly neglects her. She also has a strained relationship with her stepson Lee Yul, and rejoices at the news of his death. She is a constant suspect in any murder attempt on Yul.
 Ji Min-hyuk as Prince Seowon
Lee Yul's younger half-brother, son of Queen Park. Despite his mother's ambition for him, he is a very righteous young man, and does not want to inherit the Crown Prince title using dirty tactics. He is against corruption in the Palace and any attempt to murder his half-brother. He is shown to have feelings for his sister-in-law, the crown princess.

People in the Palace
 Choi Woong as Jung Sa-yeob
Head of Censorat, elder half-brother of Jung Jae-yoon. He despises Jae-yoon and is annoyed that Jae-yoon manages to climb up the rankings and even become the crown prince's right-hand man all on his own abilities.
 Heo Jung-min as Kim Soo-ji
Ranked 5a at Yejo, Kim Cha-eon's son, Kim So-hye's brother. He is clumsy and weak, and shown to not possess the intelligence and ambitions of his father.
 Jo Hyun-sik as Eunuch Yang
He is in charge of Lee Yul in the Palace. Cha-eon has him killed when he is able to recognise that the dead body in the crown prince's garment is not Lee Yul, but is rescued secretly. He returns to the Palace and continues to serve Lee Yul.
 Kang Young-seok as Gwon Hyeok
A Palace Guards' officer, friend of Jung Jae-yoon.
 Son Kwang-eop as Jang Moon-seok
Kim Cha-eon's right-hand man, Minister of War

People in Songjoo Village
 Jung Hae-kyun as Mr. Yeon
 Hong-sim's adoptive father. He is the only one who knows the truth of Hong-sim's identity and rescues Lee Yul in the woods. To save Hong-sim, he keeps up the ruse that Lee Yul is actually Hong-sim's betrothed, Na Won-deuk, and even buries the clothes in which Yul was found to hide his true identity. Due to his guilt towards Yul, he always takes Yul's side in any of Yul's arguments with Hong-shim. He is a widower whose wife and child died.
 Ahn Suk-hwan as Park Seon-do
Powerful yangban, Kim Cha-eon's subject. He is also involved in corruption and has a vendetta against Hong-shim for rejecting his advances and marriage offer.
 Lee Jun-hyeok as Park Bok-eun
Magistrate's henchman (promoted to Magistrate in Ep. 16). Despite the corruption by his superiors, he is shown to be righteous and has a good relationship with the villagers. 
 Lee Min-ji as Kkeut-nyeo
Hong-shim's best friend and Gu-dol's wife due to the marriage decree. They confide in each other often and despite not knowing of Hong-shim's true identity of a noble woman, Kkeut-nyeo is the only person besides Hong-shim's father to know that she was adopted and has an older brother.
 Kim Ki-doo as Gu-dol
Kkeut-nyeo's husband. He also later develops a friendship with Won-deuk and is always there to teach him and gives him advices despite finding Won-deuk useless and annoying.
 Jo Jae-ryong as Jo Boo-young, former Magistrate
 Lee Hye-eun as Yang Chun
 Jung Soo-kyo as Ma-chil, a loan shark
 Noh Kang-min as Meok-gu, a child friend of Hong-shim and Won-deuk

Others
 Lee Seung-hoon as Sin Seung-jo, Right State Councilor
 Park Seon-woo as Lee Don-young
 Lee Seung-joon as Min Yeong-gi, Minister of Rites
 Lee Chae-kyung as Court Lady Kang of Crown Princess' Palace. 
 Han Ji-eun as Ae Weol, a gisaeng friend of Jae-yoon
She has feelings for Jae-yoon despite knowing that he only has his heart on Hong-shim. However, she still acts as his trusted confidante and readily assists him in various tasks, even putting her own life at risk. She is shown to be a good artist as her spot on sketch of Won-deuk after spending some time with him under the ruse to look for her missing fan, finally unravels the truth that Lee Yul is alive to Jae-yoon. She constantly visits Jae-yoon at Songjoo Village.
 Lee Seon-hee as Mi-geum, tavern owner
 Keum Chae-an as Song Seon
 Kim Ji-sung as Makgae
 Hong Yoon-jae as Hyuk, assassin #2, Moo-yeon's friend
 Lim Seung-jun as Beom, assassin #3
 Ha Min as Head Court Lady
 Jo Jin-chul 
 Eon Rae-ok 
 Jo Yeon-woo 
 Kim Tae-yeong 
 Jung Uk 
 Park Chang-seon 
 Ji Sung-geun
 Hong Bo-hyang
 Yoon Yeo-heok

Special appearances
 Jung Ho-bin as Yoon Yi-seo's father (Ep. 1)
 Choi Ji-na as Lee Yul's mother (Ep. 1)
 Do Ji-han as Dong-joo, Crown Prince's best friend and guardian (Ep. 1–2 & 15)
 Ahn Se-ha as Heo Man-shik, King's Royal Inspector (Ep. 5 & 7)
 Jin Ji-hee as Jin Rin, young daughter of the Chinese Envoy (Ep. 13)

Production
 The first script reading took place on March 21, 2018, at CJ E&M Center in Sangam-dong, Seoul, South Korea. 
 Filming began in April and ended on September 3.
 Yoon Tae-young was removed from the drama following drunk driving charges.
 Filming took place at KOFIC Namyangju Studios in Namyangju, Gyeonggi Province, South Korea.

Original soundtrack

Part 1

Part 2

Part 3

Part 4

Part 5

In the Philippines, "Hinahanap" sung by Three Two One was released under ABS-CBN Star Music and was the show's theme song.

Ratings

References

External links
  

 100 Days My Prince at Studio Dragon 
 100 Days My Prince  at AStory 
 

Korean-language television shows
TVN (South Korean TV channel) television dramas
2018 South Korean television series debuts
2018 South Korean television series endings
South Korean historical television series
South Korean romantic comedy television series
Television series set in the Joseon dynasty
South Korean pre-produced television series
Television series by AStory